Denison House, also known as the Colonel Nathan Denison House, is a historic home located at Forty Fort, Luzerne County, Pennsylvania.  It was built about 1790, and is a -story, frame building with a central chimney in the New England style.  A rear addition and full-width front porch were added in the mid-19th century. The house has since been restored to its appearance in the 1790s.

It was added to the National Register of Historic Places in 1970.

Col. Nathan Denison was a Revolutionary Officer and a Luzerne County Judge. The Denison House features a table on which the Articles of Capitulation were signed, surrendering Forty Fort to the British and ending the Battle of Wyoming.

The property is owned and maintained by the Luzerne County Historical Society. It is open for guided tours in the summer.

References

External links

Houses on the National Register of Historic Places in Pennsylvania
Historic American Buildings Survey in Pennsylvania
Houses completed in 1790
Houses in Luzerne County, Pennsylvania
National Register of Historic Places in Luzerne County, Pennsylvania